Romny is a rural locality (a selo) and the administrative center of Romnensky District of Amur Oblast, Russia. Population:

References

Notes

Sources

Rural localities in Romnensky District